Sandbox was a Canadian alternative rock band active in the 1990s. The band consisted of Paul Murray on lead vocals, Mike Smith and Jason Archibald on guitar, Scott MacFarlane on bass and Troy Shanks on drums.

Formation

Sandbox was formed by Mike Smith in New Glasgow in 1992, originally as a cover band named Sandbox Legacy. Lead singer Paul Murray is the nephew of singer Anne Murray.

The band debuted with the 1993 indie EP, Maskman.

Canadian chart success

Their debut album Bionic was released in 1995. The album spawned their most well known singles, "Curious" and "Collide". "Curious" reached No. 34 on Canada's RPM Singles chart and No. 8 on Canada's Alternative chart, while "Collide" peaked at #57 in the RPM100. Both songs received regular airplay on MuchMusic.

They were nominated for Best New Group at the Juno Awards of 1996.

Their second album, A Murder in the Glee Club was released in 1997. Produced by Don Fleming, the album was a concept album about the aftermath of a murder. The single "Carry" peaked at #38 in the RPM100 the week of January 19, 1998. However, the band was at this time facing difficulties with their record label, who wanted them to pursue a more commercial alternative rock sound instead of their Haligonian power pop style, and they were dropped from the label after the album's release.

Breakup

Following the dissolution of the band, Smith went on to play Bubbles in the Canadian cult hit television series Trailer Park Boys. Bassist Scott MacFarlane played for Crush and Gordie Sampson. Jason Archibald graduated from Dalhousie University in 2001 with a degree in medicine.

Discography

Studio albums
1995 - Bionic
1997 - A Murder in the Glee Club

Extended plays
1993 - Maskman

Singles

References

Musical groups established in 1993
Musical groups disestablished in 1998
Musical groups from Nova Scotia
Canadian alternative rock groups